Lim Su-jeong (임수정; ; born August 20, 1986) is a female South Korean taekwondo practitioner.

Asian Games 
At the age of 16, she won the gold medal in flyweight (–51 kg) at the 2002 Asian Games, beating 2004 Olympic bronze medalist Yaowapa Boorapolchai of Thailand in the final.

In 2007, Lim won the gold medal in featherweight (–59 kg) at the 24th Summer Universiade in Bangkok, Thailand, defeating 2005 World Championship bronze medalist Chonnapas Premwaew of Thailand 8–1 in the final.

Olympic Games 
She qualified for the 2008 Beijing Olympics, finishing in first place in the –57 kg category at the World Qualification Tournament in Manchester, England. Lim won the gold medal in the women's 57 kg category at the 2008 Olympics, defeating Azize Tanrıkulu of Turkey.

References

External links
 
 
 

1986 births
Living people
South Korean female taekwondo practitioners
Olympic taekwondo practitioners of South Korea
Taekwondo practitioners at the 2008 Summer Olympics
Olympic gold medalists for South Korea
Asian Games medalists in taekwondo
Olympic medalists in taekwondo
Taekwondo practitioners at the 2002 Asian Games
Medalists at the 2008 Summer Olympics
Asian Games gold medalists for South Korea
Medalists at the 2002 Asian Games
Universiade medalists in taekwondo
Universiade gold medalists for South Korea
World Taekwondo Championships medalists
21st-century South Korean women